Joseph Leo Coen (1911 – 15 October 1941) was a Scottish professional footballer who played for Clydebank, Celtic and Luton Town as a goalkeeper. Born in Glasgow, he died during the Second World War.

Military career
At the start of World War II, Coen joined the Royal Air Force and trained to be a fighter pilot. He was killed on 15 October 1941, aged recordedly 29, in a mid-air collision whilst training at RAF Cranwell in Lincolnshire. Leading Aircraftman Coen, piloting an Airspeed Oxford, crashed into Leading Aircraftman James Yonge's Oxford, killing both instantly. He was buried in Holy Trinity Churchyard, Biscot, Luton, Bedfordshire.

See also
 List of footballers killed during World War II

References

1911 births
1941 deaths
Royal Air Force pilots of World War II
Royal Air Force personnel killed in World War II
Scottish footballers
Clydebank F.C. (1914) players
Celtic F.C. players
Luton Town F.C. players
Stenhousemuir F.C. players
AFC Bournemouth players
Scottish Football League players
English Football League players
Association football goalkeepers
British World War II fighter pilots
Footballers from Glasgow
People educated at St Aloysius' College, Glasgow
Military personnel from Glasgow